Zollikon is a municipality in the district of Meilen in the canton of Zürich, Switzerland known for being one of Switzerland's most exclusive districts. Besides the main settlement of Zollikon, which lies on the shore of Lake Zürich, the municipality also includes Zollikerberg, at a higher elevation on the road from Zürich to Forch.

Geography

Of this area, 21.2% is used for agricultural purposes, while 37.7% is forested. Of the rest of the land, 40.8% is settled (buildings or roads) and the remainder (0.3%) is non-productive (rivers, glaciers or mountains).   housing and buildings made up 33.3% of the total area, while transportation infrastructure made up the rest (7.5%). Of the total unproductive area, water (streams and lakes) made up 0.1% of the area.   36.5% of the total municipal area was undergoing some type of construction.

Zollikon is located in the Pfannenstiel region.

Zollikon is on the so-called Gold Coast of Zürich, and considered one of the most desirable and expensive municipalities in the nation.

Demographics
, 17.9% of the population was made up of foreign nationals.   the gender distribution of the population was 47.3% male and 52.7% female. Over the last 10 years the population has grown at a rate of 5.9%. Most of the population speaks German  (85.9%), with English being second most common ( 3.0%) and Italian being third ( 2.4%).

In the 2007 election, the most popular political party in Zollikon was the FDP, which received 30.8% of the vote.  The next three most popular parties were the SVP (29.4%), the SPS (14.1%) and the CSP (10.1%).

The age distribution of the population is children and teenagers (0–19 years old) make up 16.6% of the population, while adults (20–64 years old) make up 59.1% and seniors (over 64 years old) make up 24.3%.  In Zollikon about 85.3% of the population (between age 25-64) have completed either non-mandatory upper secondary education or additional higher education (either university or a Fachhochschule).  There are 5675 households in Zollikon.

Zollikon has an unemployment rate of 1.34%. , there were 44 people employed in the primary economic sector and about 14 businesses involved in this sector.  418 people are employed in the secondary sector and there are 61 businesses in this sector.  3969 people are employed in the tertiary sector, with 642 businesses in this sector.   66.7% of the working population were employed full-time, and 33.3% were employed part-time.

 there were 3171 Catholics and 4759 Protestants in Zollikon. In the 2000 census, religion was broken down into several smaller categories. Of the rest of the population, 1.8% were Muslim, 5.2% belonged to another religion (not listed), 3.5% did not give a religion, and 16.5% were atheist or agnostic.

Transport 

There are five railway stations within the municipality of Zollikon. Zollikon station is on the Lake Zürich right-bank line, and is served by S-Bahn Zürich services S6 and S16. Rehalp, Waldburg, Spital Zollikerberg and Zollikerberg stations are on the inland Forchbahn line, and are served by service S18.

Bus lines 910, 912 and 916 run through Zollikon. In the summer there are regular boats to Zurich as well as along the lake to Rapperswil, run by the Zürichsee-Schifffahrtsgesellschaft (ZSG).

People from Zollikon

 Klaus Hottinger a shoemaker born in Zollikon, in 1522 he took part in the famous Affair of the Sausages 
 Johann Heinrich Bleuler (1758 in Zollikon - 1823) a Swiss artist who worked with porcelain, landscape sketches and gouache. 
 Eugen Bleuler (1857–1939) a Swiss psychiatrist and eugenicist, born and died in Zollikon
 Ivan Ilyin (1883 – 1954 in Zollikon) a Russian religious and political philosopher
 Leander Tomarkin (1895 in Zollikon – 1967) a Swiss impostor who claimed to possess a doctorate in medicine 
 Egon von Vietinghoff (1903–1994) a German-Swiss painter, author and philosopher, lived in Zollikon from 1937 
 Bruno Giacometti (1907–2012) a Swiss architect, lived in Zollikon from 1935
 Heinz Isler (1926 in Zollikon – 2009) a Swiss structural engineer, famous for his thin concrete shells. 
 Adolf Muschg (born 1934 in Zollikon) a Swiss writer and professor of literature, member of the Gruppe Olten
 Margarita Louis-Dreyfus (born 1962) a Russian-born Swiss billionaire businesswoman, chairperson of Louis Dreyfus Company, lives in Zollikon. 
 Cédric Brunner (born 1994 in Zollikon) a Swiss professional footballer

Trivia
Friedhof Enzenbühl, those area is shared with Zürich-Weinegg, became the final resting place of some known respectively popular people, among them Inigo Gallo, César Keiser and Margrit Rainer.

Gallery

References

External links 

  

Cities in Switzerland
Municipalities of the canton of Zürich
Populated places on Lake Zurich